This is a list of unitary authorities of England ordered by population.

Areas from UK Standard Area Measurements

The list does not include North Northamptonshire and West Northamptonshire unitary authorities, created in 2021, for which statistics are not yet available.

In July 2021 plans were announced to create unitary authorities in Cumbria, North Yorkshire and Somerset in 2023.  The North Yorkshire authority will be the largest in England by population (618,054 in 2019) and by far the largest by area (8,053 km²).

References

Unitary authorities
Unitary authorities
Unitary authorities of England, List of
 Population